Chalcosyrphus acoetes is a species of hoverfly in the family Syrphidae.

Distribution
China

References

Eristalinae
Insects described in 1948
Diptera of Asia